Scott Mariani (born 1 January 1968, St Andrews Scotland) is a British Sunday Times bestselling author, best known for his thriller novels about ex-SAS Major and former theology student, Ben Hope. The first of these novels, The Alchemist's Secret, was ranked No.1 in the UK's Amazon Kindle chart for six consecutive weeks.

Biography

Mariani was born in St Andrews in Scotland and studied Modern Languages and Film Studies at Oxford University. He now resides in west Wales, where he first got the idea for the character Ben Hope when out walking. Prior to becoming a full-time writer, he worked in various jobs, including as a translator, professional musician and freelance journalist. He has cited his interests outside of writing to be shooting, archery, photography and astronomy; he is a supporter of the Woodland Trust and the World Wide Fund for Nature.

Bibliography

Ben Hope

The Ben Hope novels have been described as "James Bond meets Jason Bourne, with a historical twist". The series starts with the lead character (who has left the SAS to become a freelance "consultant" in searching and rescuing children who are kidnap victims) being recruited to try to find Fulcanelli, or at the very least his manuscript, in order to try to save the life of a child. The manuscript in question is purported to contain the secret of the elixir of life.

The use of ancient history, significant historical events, conspiracy theories and myths such as the elixir of life has become a standard theme running through the books, with others revolving around subjects such as the death of Mozart (The Mozart Conspiracy), Die Glocke (The Shadow Project) and the Great Famine of Ireland (The Forgotten Holocaust). His novels have been translated into over 20 languages.

Main series
The Alchemist's Secret (aka "The Fulcanelli Manuscript"), 2007, 
The Mozart Conspiracy, 2008, 
The Doomsday Prophecy (aka "The Hope Vendetta"), 2009, 
The Heretic's Treasure, 2009, 
The Shadow Project, 2010, 
The Lost Relic, 2011, 
The Sacred Sword, 2012, 
The Armada Legacy, 2013, 
The Nemesis Program, 2014, 
The Forgotten Holocaust, 2015, 
The Martyr's Curse, 2015, 
The Cassandra Sanction, 2016, 
Star of Africa, 2016, 
The Devil's Kingdom, 2016, 
The Babylon Idol, 2017, 
The Bach Manuscript, 2017, 
The Moscow Cipher, 2018, 
The Rebel's Revenge, 2018, 
Valley of Death, 2019, 
House of War, 2019, 
The Pretender's Gold, 2020, 
The Demon Club, 2020, 
The Pandemic Plot, 2021, 
The Crusader's Cross, 2021,  
The Silver Serpent, 2022,

Ben Short Hope novellas
Passenger 13, 2011, 
Bring Him Back, 2013, 
The Tunnel, 2015, eBook

Other works

Vampire Federation
Uprising, 2010, 
The Cross, 2011,

Other novellas
House of Malice, 2013, 
Decoy, 2014, eBook

Miscellaneous
How to Write a Thriller, 2007,

DI Tom McAllister Series
The Cage, 2021

External links
Author website

References

Living people
1968 births
People from St Andrews
British thriller writers
British male novelists